Sir Robert Hitcham (1572? – 1636) was a Member of Parliament and Attorney General under King James I.

Early life
Robert was born of lowly origin in Levington, near Ipswich, and educated at the Free School at Ipswich and later Pembroke College, Cambridge, studying law.  He was admitted to Gray's Inn on 3 November 1589 from Barnard's Inn and was called to the Bar in 1595.

Political career
He became a Member of Parliament for West Looe, Cornwall from 1597 to 1598; for King's Lynn, Norfolk from 1604 to 1611; for Cambridge in 1614 and for Orford, Suffolk from 1624 to 1626.

He held a number of posts including: Attorney-General to Anne of Denmark, Queen Consort to James I (1603–?); Sergeant-at-law (1614–?); and King's Senior Sergeant-at-law (1616–?). He was knighted on 29 June 1604 by King James I.

Later life

On 14 May 1635 he purchased Framlingham Castle, Suffolk from Theophilus Howard, 2nd Earl of Suffolk for the sum of £14,000.

He died on 15 August 1636 and now lies in a tomb in the Church of St Michael the Archangel, Framlingham.

Legacy
His will stated that the castle, save for the outer walls, be demolished and the stone used to build a poor house.  The inner buildings were duly demolished and a poor house, Sir Robert Hitcham's Almshouses, was built in its place. He also endowed a school for local children (originally boys only), which was the foundation of the current Framlingham Sir Robert Hitcham primary school. His also left money in his will to fund a school in both Debenham & Coggeshall. With the school in Debenham being named after him; Sir Robert Hitcham CEVA Primary School.

He bequeathed the site of the castle to the Master, Fellows and Scholars of Pembroke College, Cambridge. Some of the land he left was later given by the College as the site for Framlingham College, a school built as a memorial to Prince Albert.

Hitcham's Cloister in Pembroke College (built 1666) was named after him  as is the Hitcham House at Thomas Mills High School in Framlingham.

References

1570s births
1636 deaths
Burials in Suffolk
Members of the pre-1707 English Parliament for constituencies in Cornwall
Serjeants-at-law (England)
Members of Gray's Inn
Alumni of Pembroke College, Cambridge
People educated at Ipswich School
Politicians from Ipswich
English MPs 1597–1598
English MPs 1604–1611
English MPs 1614
English MPs 1624–1625
16th-century English lawyers